Raven Barber (born 2 October 1991) is an American professional basketball player for U.D. Oliveirense of the Liga Portuguesa de Basquetebol. He has experience playing with multiple teams in Europe, and was named Rookie of the Year in his initial season with the Halifax Rainmen in the National Basketball League of Canada (NBL). Barber played four years of college basketball with Mount St. Mary's after graduating from Paul VI Catholic High School in Fairfax, Virginia.

On March 1, 2022, Barber signed with U.D. Oliveirense.

References

External links 
 USBasket.com profile
 FIBA.com profile
 Mount bio
 Raven Barber at RealGM

1991 births
Living people
American expatriate basketball people in Canada
American expatriate basketball people in Colombia
American expatriate basketball people in Israel
American expatriate basketball people in Spain
American expatriate basketball people in Sweden
American expatriate basketball people in Portugal
American men's basketball players
Basketball players from Maryland
Centers (basketball)
Halifax Rainmen players
Mount St. Mary's Mountaineers men's basketball players
People from Edgewood, Maryland
Power forwards (basketball)
S.L. Benfica basketball players
Södertälje Kings players
Sportspeople from the Baltimore metropolitan area